Danial Fadzly Abdullah (born 14 January 1979) is a Malaysian former footballer. He can operate as a midfielder or defender.

He is of Malaysian Siamese heritage. Formerly a Buddhist under the name Wirat Nom, he converted to Islam in 2004 and has taken the name Danial Fadzly.

References

External links
 https://web.archive.org/web/20120324154921/http://www.kelantanfc.com/danial-fadly-abdullah-aksi-danial-ketika-membantu-solehin-mengawal-pemain-felda-united-3/

1979 births
Living people
Malaysian footballers
Perak F.C. players
Kedah Darul Aman F.C. players
Perlis FA players
Kelantan FA players
Malaysian people of Thai descent
Penang F.C. players
People from Kedah
Association football defenders
Association football midfielders